

Results
Arsenal's score comes first

London Combination

Selected results from the league.

Final League table

References

1918-19
English football clubs 1918–19 season